In nonstandard analysis, a hyperinteger n is a hyperreal number that is equal to its own integer part.  A hyperinteger may be either finite or infinite.  A finite hyperinteger is an ordinary integer.  An example of an infinite hyperinteger is given by the class of the sequence  in the ultrapower construction of the hyperreals.

Discussion
The standard integer part function: 

is defined for all real x and equals the greatest integer not exceeding x.  By the transfer principle of nonstandard analysis, there exists a natural extension: 

defined for all hyperreal x, and we say that x is a hyperinteger if  Thus the hyperintegers are the image of the integer part function on the hyperreals.

Internal sets
The set  of all hyperintegers is an internal subset of the hyperreal line .  The set of all finite hyperintegers (i.e.  itself) is not an internal subset.  Elements of the complement  are called, depending on the author, nonstandard, unlimited, or infinite hyperintegers. The reciprocal of an infinite hyperinteger is always an infinitesimal.

Nonnegative hyperintegers are sometimes called hypernatural numbers. Note that the latter gives a non-standard model of arithmetic in the sense of Skolem.

References
 Howard Jerome Keisler: Elementary Calculus: An Infinitesimal Approach. First edition 1976; 2nd edition 1986. This book is now out of print. The publisher has reverted the copyright to the author, who has made available the 2nd edition in .pdf format available for downloading at http://www.math.wisc.edu/~keisler/calc.html

Nonstandard analysis
Infinity
Calculus